Hochrindl (1561 m) is a mountain pass and alpine ski resort in the Austrian Alps located between Reichenau and Albeck. The pass was largely uninhabited and used as pasture land until the late 20th century when it became a location for summer and winter tourism.

References

External links

Mountain passes of Carinthia (state)
Mountain passes of the Alps
Skiing in the Alps
Ski areas and resorts in Austria